William Henry Harrison School is a historic school building located in the Yorktown neighborhood of Philadelphia, Pennsylvania.  It was designed by architect Irwin T. Catharine (1883–1944) and built in 1928–1929.  It is a three-story brick building, nine bays wide on a raised basement in the Late Gothic Revival-style.  It features a one-story, stone entrance pavilion with a Tudor-arched opening and a crenellated parapet.  It is named for President William Henry Harrison.

It was added to the National Register of Historic Places in 1988. The building is currently home to the St. Malachy School.

References

External links 

School buildings on the National Register of Historic Places in Philadelphia
Gothic Revival architecture in Pennsylvania
School buildings completed in 1929
Lower North Philadelphia
Catholic elementary schools in Philadelphia
1929 establishments in Pennsylvania